U-25 may refer to one of the following German submarines:

 , was a Type U 23 submarine launched in 1913 and that served in the First World War until surrendered on 23 February 1919
 During the First World War, Germany also had these submarines with similar names:
 , a Type UB II submarine launched in 1915 and surrendered on 26 November 1918
 , a Type UC II submarine launched in 1916 and scuttled on 28 October 1918
 , a Type IA submarine that served in the Second World War until lost in August 1940
 , a Type 206 submarine of the Bundesmarine that was launched in 1974; no longer in service

Submarines of Germany